La La Land: Original Motion Picture Soundtrack is the soundtrack album to the 2016 film La La Land. The soundtrack album was released through Interscope Records on December 9, 2016. The album has peaked at number 2 on the US Billboard 200 and number 1 on the UK Albums Chart. At the 89th Academy Awards, the film won the Academy Awards for Best Original Score and Best Original Song for "City of Stars".

Composition
The songs and score for La La Land were composed and orchestrated by Justin Hurwitz, film director Damien Chazelle's Harvard University classmate, who also worked on his two prior films. The lyrics were written by Pasek and Paul, except for "Start a Fire", which was written by John Legend, Hurwitz and Marius de Vries.

Track listing

Awards

Charts

Weekly charts

Year-end charts

Certifications

References

2016 soundtrack albums
Albums produced by Marius de Vries
Comedy-drama film soundtracks
Grammy Award for Best Compilation Soundtrack for Visual Media
Grammy Award for Best Score Soundtrack for Visual Media
Interscope Records soundtracks
Jazz soundtracks
Musical film soundtracks
Romance film soundtracks
Scores that won the Best Original Score Academy Award